Eccleston is a former civil parish, now in the parishes of Eaton and Eccleston and Dodleston, in Cheshire West and Chester, England.  It contains 46 buildings that are recorded in the National Heritage List for England as designated listed buildings.  One of these is listed at Grade I, the highest grade, four at the middle grade, Grade II*, and the rest at the lowest grade, Grade II.  The parish is contained within the estate of Eaton Hall, and many of the listed buildings were built for members of the Grosvenor family, in particular the 1st Duke of Westminster, who provided many commissions for the Chester architect John Douglas.

Key

Buildings

See also
Grade II listed buildings in Chester (south)

Listed buildings in Eaton
Listed buildings in Dodleston
Listed buildings in Marlston-cum-Lache
Listed buildings in Poulton
Listed buildings in Pulford
Listed buildings in Aldford
Listed buildings in Saighton
Listed buildings in Huntington

References
Citations

Sources

Listed buildings in Cheshire West and Chester
Lists of listed buildings in Cheshire